Echinoneus is a genus of echinoderms belonging to the family Echinoneidae.

The genus has almost cosmopolitan distribution.

Species:

Echinoneus burgeri 
Echinoneus cyclostomus 
Echinoneus robustus 
Echinoneus rojasi 
Echinoneus sanchezi 
Echinoneus tenuipetalum

References

Echinoneoida
Echinoidea genera